Saye may refer to:

 Saye, a woollen cloth historically woven in England
 Saye, Mali, a town in Mali
 Saye, Dahanu, a village in Maharashtra, India
 Baron Saye and Sele, British peerage
 Viscount Saye and Sele, British peerage